The Variations on a Nursery Tune for piano and orchestra, Op. 25, were written by Ernst von Dohnányi in 1914. It is subtitled "For the enjoyment of friends of humor, to the annoyance of others" on the manuscript, though he omitted this inscription on the concert program and on the published edition, fearing that it might sound somewhat provocative. The work was premiered in Berlin on 17 February 1914.

Structure 
The Variations on a Nursery Tune consist of an introduction and theme, eleven variations and a coda.

 Introduction. Maestoso
 Theme. Allegro
 Variation I. Poco più mosso
 Variation II. Risoluto
 Variation III. L'istesso tempo
 Variation IV. Molto meno mosso (Allegretto moderato)
 Variation V. Più mosso
 Variation VI. Ancora più mosso (Allegro)
 Variation VII. Walzer (Tempo giusto)
 Variation VIII. Alla marcia (Allegro moderato)
 Variation IX. Presto
 Variation X. Passacaglia (Adagio non troppo)
 Variation XI. Choral (Maestoso)
 Finale fugato (Allegro vivace)

After a dramatic introduction, the theme – Twinkle, Twinkle, Little Star – is introduced, followed by eleven variations on it, including a waltz and a more serious passacaglia.

Dohnányi alludes to many different works, or composers' distinctive compositional styles, in the piece. For instance, variation 8 suggests the march from the second movement of Tchaikovsky's "Little Russian" Symphony. Debussy is alluded to, with the ethereal harmonies of the 11th variation. Dohnányi pokes fun at nearly every composer his audience of 1914 would have been familiar with.

Reception 
The work made Dohnányi famous, particularly in England, where the audience "seemed to have a real sense of humor", and North America.

References

External links 

Nursery Tune
Compositions for piano and orchestra
1914 compositions
Compositions by Ernst von Dohnányi